Opsiphanes sallei is a butterfly of the family Nymphalidae. It is found in Venezuela, Bolivia, Colombia and Peru.

References

Subspecies
Opsiphanes sallei sallei (Venezuela)
Opsiphanes sallei nicandrus (Bolivia)
Opsiphanes sallei colombiana (Colombia)
Opsiphanes sallei kennerlyi (Peru)

Morphinae
Nymphalidae of South America
Taxa named by Edward Doubleday
Butterflies described in 1849